Firestone District is one of four districts located in Margibi County, Liberia. It is home to Duside Hospital.

Districts of Liberia
Margibi County

ir:Distretto di Firestone